Banamali Maharana (16 May 1941 – 17 November 2018) was an Indian percussionist who played Mardala.

Career
Maharana began playing Khola (Mrudanga) and Dholak with Goswami.

His formal training began after he joined the Annapurna Theatre, where he learned percussion from Singhari Shyamsundar Kar and Kshetramohan Kar. His brother, Guru Kelucharan Mohapatra accompanied him to most of his dance performances.

Maharana started teaching Mardala at Kala Vikas Kendra in Cuttack and then at Utkal Sangeet Mahavidyalaya. He introduced a seven-year course in Mardala music at the Utkal Sangeet Mahavidyalaya before retiring as the Head of the Mardala department in 1999.

Maharana was the most sought-after Mardal player for Odissi performances in his time. Besides Kelucharana, Banamali accompanied Sanjukta Panigrahi, Oopali Operajita, Priyambada Mohanty Hejmadi, Sonal Mansingh, Aruna Mohanty, Sujata Mohapatra, Parwati Dutta and others in dance performances, in India and abroad.

Awards

 Kabi Samrat Upendra Bhanja Sanman - 2016

References

1941 births
2018 deaths
Indian percussionists
People from Puri district
Recipients of the Sangeet Natak Akademi Award
Odissi music
Odissi Mardala
Mardala players